Caring and Killing: 1991 Through 1994 is a compilation album by American metalcore band Converge, originally released in 1995 through Lost & Found Records and  re-released on November 17, 1997 through Hydra Head Records.

Release 
The album was originally released as a European exclusive through Lost & Found Records. However, Converge became dissatisfied with the way the label was handling the release and over charging fans for their hard to find older songs. Caring and Killing was re-released through Hydra Head Records on November 17, 1997 in America to "make an overpriced release obsolete." The album was the seventh release through Hydra Head, founded by Aaron Turner of Isis in 1993.

In 2013, Hydra Head Records reissued Caring and Killing. The album was released exclusively on vinyl, featured updated artwork by Jacob Bannon and Aaron Turner and was remastered by Alan Douches.

Song history 
Caring and Killing features most of Converge's debut album Halo in a Haystack in addition to songs released on various compilations, demos and previously unreleased tracks.

The final track, "But Life Goes On", was recorded for Converge's debut 7" but was never released.

A rerecorded version of "Dead" and a live version of "Antithesis" were released on the band's second album Petitioning the Empty Sky.

Though the album packaging and liner notes suggest the album contains sixteen tracks, only fifteen tracks are present. The opening instrumental song "Shallow Breathing" from Halo in a Haystack was combined with "I Abstain" to create the first track.

Converge's split album with Hellchild, Deeper the Wound, featured a live recording of "Shallow Breathing".

Track listing

Personnel
Album personnel as listed in CD liner notes.
Converge
 Jacob Bannon – vocals
 Kurt Ballou – guitar
 Aaron Dalbec – guitar (tracks 1–13)
 Jeff Feinburg – bass guitar
 Damon Bellorado – drums

Session musicians
 Erik Ralston – bass guitar on tracks 1–6, 11–13

Guests
 Skott Wade – backing vocals on track 6

Original production and recording
 Tracks 1–6, 11–13 recorded at West Sound in August 1993 & 1994; engineered by Mike West, produced by Converge
 Tracks 7–10 recorded at Salad Days One in winter 1994/1995; engineered and produced by Brian "Fury" McTernan
 Tracks 14–15 recorded at West Sound in winter 1991/1992
 Track 16 recorded at West Sound in June 1991

Album art (1997)
 Jacob Bannon – design
 Mark Lickosky – still photography
 Cardone – live photography
 Erik Zimmerman – live photography
 Tim Mailloux – live photography

Remaster personnel (2013)
 Alan Douches – remastering all songs at West West Side
 Aaron Turner – artwork
 Jacob Bannon – design

Notes

References

Converge (band) albums
1997 debut albums
1997 compilation albums
Hydra Head Records compilation albums